The Odd Couple (titled onscreen Neil Simon's The Odd Couple) is an American sitcom television series broadcast from September 24, 1970 to March 7, 1975 on ABC. The show, which stars Tony Randall as Felix Unger and Jack Klugman as Oscar Madison, was the first of several sitcoms developed by Garry Marshall for Paramount Television. The series is based on the 1965 play The Odd Couple written by Neil Simon, which was also adapted into the 1968 film The Odd Couple. The story examines two divorced men, Oscar and Felix, who share a Manhattan apartment and whose opposite personalities inevitably lead to conflict and laughter.

In 1997, the episodes "Password" and "The Fat Farm" were ranked No. 5 and No. 58, respectively, on TV Guides 100 Greatest Episodes of All Time. The show received three nominations for the Primetime Emmy Award for Outstanding Comedy Series.

History

The success of the 1968 film version of the stage play of The Odd Couple, which starred Jack Lemmon as Felix and Walter Matthau as Oscar, catalyzed production of the television show. Mickey Rooney and Martin Balsam were also considered for the part of Oscar and Dean Martin and Art Carney for Felix (Carney had originated the role on Broadway).

Eventually Tony Randall (as Felix) and Jack Klugman (as Oscar) were hired; Klugman had replaced Walter Matthau as Oscar in the original Broadway production, and Randall had also appeared as Felix in other productions of the play. Randall, who was hired first, had still wanted Mickey Rooney to play Oscar. Co-executive producer Garry Marshall had to lobby hard to get Klugman successfully hired. Once the casting was in place, the show's writers (Marshall, Jerry Belson, Jerry Paris, Bob Brunner, Mark Rothman and Lowell Ganz, among others) came up with a multitude of situations for Felix and Oscar to be in, while staying true to the soul of the play, which always reverted to the human tensions between the two that created the comic situations.

The show premiered on ABC on September 24, 1970. The first season was filmed at Paramount studios using the single-camera method and a laugh track, utilizing the same apartment set seen in Paramount's 1968 film version. Klugman and Randall both expressed displeasure with using a laugh track without a live audience. Marshall also disliked the practice; theatre veteran Randall particularly resented the process of having to wait several seconds between punchlines in order to allot enough space for the laughter to be inserted. The production team eventually experimented with omitting the laugh track altogether for Season One's 21st episode, "Oscar's New Life" (laughter was subsequently added for syndication in order to maintain continuity). By the second season, ABC relented, and the show was then filmed with three cameras and performed like a stage play in front of a live studio audience, with laugh sweetening completed during post-production.

The change also required construction of a new, larger apartment set with a new layout, within a theatre at Paramount.

Randall and Klugman both enjoyed the spontaneity that came with performing in front of a live audience; any missed or blown lines usually went by without stopping (they would be reshot during post-production). In addition, it gave the show a certain edge that had been lost during the first season, although the actors had to deliver lines more loudly, since they were on a larger sound stage, as opposed to a quiet studio with only minimal crew present.

Klugman later recalled, "We spent three days rehearsing the show. We sat around a table the first day. We tore the script apart. We took out all the jokes and put in character. The only reason we leave in any jokes is for the rotten canned laughter. I hated it. I watch the shows at home, I see Oscar come in and he says, 'Hi,' and there is the laughter. 'Hey,' I think, 'what the hell did I do?' I hate it; it insults the audience."

Throughout its five years on ABC, The Odd Couple was juggled several times around the network's programming schedule, never reaching the Top 30 in the Nielsen ratings. However, ABC continually renewed the show because the ratings for the summer reruns were consistently high.

In the final first-run episode, "Felix Remarries", Felix finally wins his ex-wife Gloria back and they remarry, as Oscar regains the freedom of living alone again. The final scene unfolds in this way, as the two say their goodbyes:

Felix: Your dinner's in the oven; turn it off in 20 minutes. [pause] Oscar … what can I say? Five years ago you took me in: a broken man on the verge of … mental collapse. I leave here a cured human being. I owe it all to you. [gesturing toward apartment] It's all yours buddy. I salute you. [empties waste basket onto floor]
Oscar: Felix, you know how I'm gonna salute you? I'm gonna clean that up.
Felix: It has not been in vain.
[They shake hands and Felix exits stage left through front door. After door closes …]
Oscar: [swings his hand through the air] I'm not gonna clean that up. [exits stage right to bedroom to audience laughter]
[Felix sneaks back in stage left and looks at floor]
Felix: [disgustedly] I knew he wouldn't clean it up! [proceeds to pick up trash to audience applause] (fade out)

The 114 episodes went on to syndication and home video.

Differences between the series and the play/film

 In the TV series, Felix's last name was spelled Unger but in the play and film it is spelled Ungar. 

 In the stage play, Felix is a news writer for CBS (in the film he writes the news for "television"), while in the TV series he is a commercial photographer. (His slogan, which he is quick to vocalize, is "Portraits a specialty".) 

 Felix's wife is named Frances in the play and in the film, but is Gloria in the TV series.

 In the play and the film, Oscar has at least two children (including a son "Brucey"), who are referred to but not seen. In the series, Oscar is childless. In the play and the film, Felix has a son and a younger daughter. In the series, the children's birth order is reversed, and they are named Leonard and Edna, after Tony Randall's middle name and the name of his sister.

 In the series, Felix is portrayed as being rather highbrow with refined tastes in food, music and the arts in general; he is baffled by much of popular culture. In the play/film, Felix is much more of a “regular guy”: He ogles go-go dancers,   plays poker, goes bowling and shoots pool. Though the pre-TV Felix enjoys cooking and prepares well-crafted sandwiches for his friends, he mentions on different occasions preparing rather simple dinners like meatloaf, franks and beans and cole slaw. When the dinner he has prepared for the Pigeon Sisters  burns (meatloaf in the film, London Broil in the play), he suggests substituting corned beef sandwiches from the local delicatessen.

Supporting characters

The Pigeon Sisters (Monica Evans as Cecily and Carole Shelley as Gwendolyn, reprising their roles from the Broadway stage play and film) made four appearances during the first season. The sisters were never seen after that, but were occasionally mentioned later on. Oscar gained a steady girlfriend during that latter part of the first season and half of the second, Dr. Nancy Cunningham (portrayed by Joan Hotchkis), an attractive physician is, whose colleague, Dr. Melnitz (played by Bill Quinn in several episodes), is a curmudgeonly and sardonic older doctor who treats both Felix and Oscar. Felix also gained a girlfriend in the third season, Miriam Welby (portrayed by Elinor Donahue), and they lasted into the fifth season, presumably breaking up before Felix and Gloria remarry in the series finale. Christopher Shea appeared in three episodes of the first season as Philip, Felix and Oscar's precocious 11-year-old neighbor. Oscar makes frequent references to "Crazy Rhoda Zimmerman", his occasional good-time girlfriend, but she never appears onscreen.

The TV show also featured their ex-wives. Janis Hansen appeared as Felix's former wife Gloria (named Frances in the play and film), and Jack Klugman's real-life wife Brett Somers portrayed Blanche, Oscar's acerbic ex-wife (The couple separated in real life during the final season of the series). There were several episodes in which Felix felt he had not tried hard enough to reconcile with Gloria, and took comically drastic measures to try to win her back. In contrast, Oscar seemed quite happy to be divorced from Blanche, and she from him, as the two constantly traded sarcastic barbs. The only major drawback from Oscar's point of view was the alimony he was ordered to pay. Willie Aames and later Leif Garrett made a few appearances as Felix's son, Leonard. Pamelyn Ferdin and later Doney Oatman appeared as Felix's teenaged daughter, Edna.

The two other major supporting characters, Officer Murray Greshler and Myrna Turner, Oscar's secretary, were portrayed by Al Molinaro and Penny Marshall (Garry's sister) respectively. Alice Ghostley played Murray's wife Mimi in one episode of the first season when Felix quickly outstays his welcome after he moves out of Oscar's apartment after a falling-out. Jane Dulo made one appearance as Mimi in the second season. The regular cast was rounded out by Garry Walberg, Larry Gelman and Ryan McDonald who portrayed Oscar's poker cronies Homer "Speed" Deegan, the bald, bespectacled Vincent "Vinnie" Barella and Roy, Oscar's accountant, respectively. Ryan McDonald left the show after the seventh of the first season's eight episodes in which there was a poker game, and the character of Roy was mentioned occasionally after that, but never seen again.

Garry Walberg (who later appeared with his friend Klugman on the 1976-83 series Quincy M.E.) as "Speed", and Larry Gelman as Vinnie, both made several scattered guest appearances after the first season. Character actor Richard Stahl was seen in nine episodes as, among other things, a florist, a pet-shop owner, a psychiatrist, a volunteer fireman and a non-denominational monk, never playing the same role twice. Veteran character actors Herbie Faye and Phil Leeds appeared on the series in different roles, five and three times respectively.   Oscar's mother appeared in two different episodes, played once by Elvia Allman, and once by Jane Dulo, both veteran actresses.  Character actor John Fiedler who portrayed Vinnie in the 1968 film version, made two guest appearances in different roles. Victor Buono guest-starred in two episodes, playing a different role in each. Veteran stand-up comedian Leonard Barr made appearances in five episodes.

Celebrity guest stars

As themselves

The show often had celebrity guest stars, who reflected the cultural leanings either of Oscar or Felix, either playing themselves or fictional characters.

Sportscaster Howard Cosell (2 episodes) and then ABC television producer Roone Arledge (1 episode) played themselves.

Pop singer Jaye P. Morgan played herself as one of Oscar's many girlfriends. Opera singers Martina Arroyo and Richard Fredricks appeared as themselves. Other celebrities appearing as themselves included Edward Villella, Monty Hall, Richard Dawson, Wolfman Jack, David Steinberg, Hugh Hefner, Rodney Allen Rippy, John Simon, Bubba Smith, Deacon Jones, John Barbour and Allen Ludden and Betty White (married in real life). In one episode, noted tennis frenemies and real-life competitors Bobby Riggs and Billie Jean King appeared as themselves.

Singer-songwriter Paul Williams appeared in an episode where Felix's daughter Edna runs away to follow Williams on tour. (Williams dissuades her.) Dick Clark made an appearance as himself, a radio disc jockey who calls Oscar in a contest, where he wins a new car (The New Car, episode 76). Neil Simon (the author of the play which the series is based upon) makes an uncredited cameo appearance during the fifth season in Two on the Aisle, as does Bob Hope in The Hollywood Story.

Fictional depictions
 Marilyn Horne played Jackie Hartman, a shy but musically talented co-worker of Oscar's.
 Roy Clark played "Wild" Willie Boggs, an old practical joke-playing friend of Oscar's, who nonetheless has enormous musical talent, impressing even Felix.
 Jean Simmons played the visiting Princess Lydia from the fictional European country of Liechtenberg (Peggy Rea played her lady-in-waiting), who meets Felix in a photography session but goes out on a date with Oscar, and he comes home bragging of a wonderful time. He proudly relates that the Princess had a wonderful time also, and that "she knighted a wino".
 Pernell Roberts played country music impresario Billy Joe Babcock, to whom Oscar owes a lot of money in gambling debts, and who does NOT take IOUs.
 Jack Soo played Chinese wrestler Chuk Mai Chin.
 Reta Shaw played a tough retired Army Colonel, Claire Frost, who works as housekeeper when Oscar is sick and Felix is too busy. She hails from Bayonne, New Jersey, and her domineering ways cause Oscar to derisively refer to her as "The Beast of Bayonne". 
 Penny Marshall, who played Oscar's secretary, Myrna Turner, made her last appearance in an episode in which she married "Sheldn" (his legal name since the "o" was omitted from his birth certificate), played by Rob Reiner, Marshall's husband at the time. Marshall's real-life brother and sister, Garry and Ronnie played Myrna's siblings, Werner Turner and Verna Turner, in the same episode. 
 Victor Buono appeared twice, as Mr. Lovelace, the eccentric new manager of the building in which Felix and Oscar live, who loves plants but hates people, and as Dr. Clove, an "exorcist" in an episode inspired by the film The Exorcist in which the boys think their apartment is haunted.
 Albert Brooks, as Rudy Mandel, a pretentious advertising colleague of Felix (in two episodes in the show's first season)
 William Redfield as Felix's brother Floyd Unger, owner of Unger Gum in Buffalo, New York.

Awards and nominations

During its original run, the show had mediocre ratings at best (the show was never among the Top 30 programs on the Nielsen ratings list during its entire run). Nonetheless, both actors were nominated for Emmy Awards in each year of the show's run. Jack Klugman won two Emmy Awards for his work (in 1971 and 1973), and Tony Randall won an Emmy as well (in 1975, upon accepting the award, he commented on the fact that he wished he "had a job,” as the show had recently been cancelled).

Klugman was nominated for a Golden Globe in 1972 and won one in 1974. The show itself was also nominated for an Emmy Award for Outstanding Comedy Series in the years 1971, 1972, and 1974. To date, these are the last Emmy nominations to a sitcom airing on a Friday night.

Opening narration and credit sequence
For the first three seasons, the program's opening credit sequence consisted of Felix and Oscar in various humorous situations around New York City. These scenes included Felix trying, to no avail, to help an old lady cross the street, Oscar walking into wet cement while ogling a girl with a revealing dress, Oscar eating a hot dog and getting chili on his shirt, and both men cavorting around a Maypole. The end of the introduction title sequence (for the series entire run) showed the duo sitting on a park bench in front of the William Tecumseh Sherman Monument in Grand Army Plaza at West 58th Street and Fifth Avenue, where Oscar throws his lunch wrapper on the ground, while Felix beckons him to pick it up.

Halfway through the show's debut season, a "prologue" was added to the introduction and featured a narration (the voice of actor Bill Woodson) retelling how Felix and Oscar came to live together:

"On November 13, Felix Unger was asked to remove himself from his place of residence." (Unger's unseen wife slams door, only to reopen it and hand Felix his pan.) "That request came from his wife. Deep down, he knew she was right. But he also knew that, someday, he would return to her. With nowhere else to go, he appeared at the home of his childhood friend, Oscar Madison. Sometime earlier, Madison's wife had thrown him out, requesting that he never return. Can two divorced men share an apartment, without driving each other crazy?"

ABC apparently added the narration because it did not want the audience to speculate about a homosexual subtext, given the changing perceptions of masculinity at the time. ABC insisted that every episode mention that the characters were both divorced. It was noted that Oscar had been thrown out of his home like Felix, when several episodes had shown that Oscar had lived in the same apartment before and during his marriage (as in the original play and film). Later, the opening narrative stated that when Felix moved into Oscar's apartment, Oscar was already divorced.

In another case, the fourth episode showed Felix and Oscar meeting during jury duty. Later, the opening narration included a retcon that they were childhood friends. During the second season, the narration changed it to them being “simply friends,” and the "sometime earlier" narrative was also changed to "several years earlier.”  Later, in an episode aired in 1973, the two were in the Army together, with Felix being Oscar's superior at the time Oscar and wife Blanche (Brett Somers) married. An episode aired in 1974, the epilogue showed Oscar's recollection of meeting Felix when they were children.

In later seasons, the opening sequence featured highlights from past episodes, mixed with the previous footage as well as another clip (recreated from a scene on the show), in which Felix reprimands Oscar for drying his hands on the curtains, only to have Oscar use Felix's shirt as a towel as well.

For the first three seasons of the show, the closing credits of the show consisted of more of the duo's zany antics, such as Felix talking to a man repairing a street clock and Oscar indiscreetly looking at a peep show. During the fourth season, the credits included a scene where Oscar throws his cigar into a fountain in Columbus Circle, Felix barks at him to pick it up, and Oscar scoops it up with his shoe and then places the wet, soiled cigar butt in Felix's pocket. For the final season, the credits were shown against a blue background.

Related appearances by Klugman and Randall
Over the years, Klugman and Randall  appeared in many television commercials and public service announcements for several different products as Felix and Oscar, including 1972 ads for Yoplait yogurt (Klugman later appeared in commercials without Randall for the product in the early 1980s); in 1974, for the game Challenge Yahtzee; for a while, their likenesses also appeared on the game's packaging, with the slogan "You play your way—I'll play mine!"; in the late 1980s and early 1990s, Klugman and Randall reprised their Odd Couple characters in a series of commercials for Eagle Snacks, although in some of these spots they called each other by their real names.

Klugman and Randall also reprised their roles as Felix and Oscar in several regional productions of the original Neil Simon play. They toured in the play during the TV version's summertime off-season in the early to mid-1970s; they later appeared in several performances of the play during the late 1980s and early 1990s. In 1997, they appeared in a Broadway revival of the Simon play, The Sunshine Boys.

In the early 1980s, while starring in the NBC drama Quincy, M.E., Klugman appeared in TV commercials for Canon copiers. Minolta countered by hiring Randall, then on the NBC sitcom Love, Sidney, to do a commercial for that company's copiers where he channeled his Felix role, mentioning that he "can change copy colors without getting that disgusting black powder all over my hands!" He closed by saying "But that doesn't mean I'm a neat freak. Of course, I'm not a slob, either, like, uh... " and waved his hand, to suggest Klugman as Oscar.

Randall and Klugman reunited for the 1993 television movie, The Odd Couple Together Again to a mixed reception. Klugman had lost a vocal cord to throat cancer and this real-life struggle was written into the script. In the film, Felix tries to help Oscar recover following surgery; he also becomes overly involved in his daughter Edna's upcoming wedding, much to her and Gloria's (Barbara Barrie) dismay.

Other versions
An ABC cartoon version of The Odd Couple premiered on September 6, 1975 titled The Oddball Couple during the network's  Saturday morning kids' programming block, Funshine Saturday. Although authorized by Neil Simon (who received a "based on" credit) completely different characters were created: "Spiffy" (a fussy cat voiced by Frank Nelson) and "Fleabag" (a sloppy dog voiced by Paul Winchell) who live together in a house that is half rundown and messy and half pristine and tidy along with a matching car. It was directed and produced by  David DePatie and Friz Freleng, along with Gerry Chiniquy, and Robert McKimson among others, who directed several episodes. The characters' professions in this version were reversed from the original series, with the fastidious Spiffy working as a reporter and the rumpled Fleabag a photographer, often working together. The cartoon was canceled in 1977.

In 1982, as a hedge against the 1981 Writers Guild of America strike, ABC aired an African-American version of The Odd Couple, starring  Ron Glass as Felix and Demond Wilson as Oscar. It was called The New Odd Couple, and initially used eight previously-filmed scripts from the original series; when the strike ended during the series' production, union writers returned, and original episodes were written from then on. It was canceled after only half a season.

A Chilean version titled Una Pareja Dispareja began airing in January 2009 on TVN (which had aired the series during the 1970s). This version takes several of its cues from Two and a Half Men, a Chuck Lorre-created sitcom with a similar premise to The Odd Couple (even alluded to the similarities between the two in the episode "Whipped Unto The Third Generation"). Some of the details taken from Two and a Half Men include Felix and Oscar being siblings instead of friends, as well as Felix being a doctor and Oscar a musician.

Another American remake, also called The Odd Couple, aired on CBS for three seasons from 2015 to 2017. This version, a multi-camera sitcom, was co-created and co-produced by Matthew Perry, who played Oscar, while Thomas Lennon played Felix.

Episodes

Home media
The Complete First Season of The Odd Couple was released on DVD in Region 1 on August 18, 2006 by Time Life Video under license from Paramount Home Entertainment (Paramount Television was the program's original distributor). Some episodes, mainly from the first season, were available on a VHS videotape set during the 1990s, and distributed by Columbia House.

Each episode on the First Season DVDs contain an introduction from the show's producer Garry Marshall. Also included as extras are Emmy Awards speeches, bloopers, TV interviews with the show's stars and a clip of The Odd Couple on Broadway.

Paramount/CBS DVD have since released the remaining seasons (two through five) of The Odd Couple on DVD in Region 1. Season 1 was released in Region 2 on April 28, 2008. While the Time/Life Season 1 DVD release contained only unedited episodes as originally broadcast, CBS Home Entertainment opted to edit their DVDs of seasons two through five, removing short segments or occasionally entire scenes which included music sung by Felix or some other character. A notable example of this can be seen in the Season 5 episode "Strike Up the Band or Else" where, in the epilogue, guest star Pernell Roberts' character is going to sing, and the episode abruptly ends and closing credits roll. Fans and critics alike lambasted CBS/Paramount for the shoddy treatment The Odd Couple DVD releases received, concluding that the studio has misled consumers by labeling their DVD sets as "complete" when they have been intentionally edited to avoid paying royalties required by the music publishers.

On June 16, 2015, CBS DVD released The Odd Couple- The Complete Series on DVD in Region 1, albeit with the same edits and removal of scenes with music.

In Australia (Region 4), Paramount released The First Season in 2008, and no further releases were made. In 2016, Via Vision Entertainment obtained the rights to release the entire series from July 2016 through until September 2016. Followed by a Complete Series boxset in November 2016.

References

External links

 
1049 Park Avenue: An Odd Couple Podcast

1970 American television series debuts
1970s American sitcoms
1975 American television series endings
American Broadcasting Company original programming
Fictional duos
Live action television shows based on films
Television duos
Television series based on adaptations
Television series based on plays
Television series by CBS Studios
Television shows set in New York City
The Odd Couple
Television series based on works by Neil Simon